Chitwan English Secondary Boarding School is a school in the Chitwan District of Nepal.

The founders of the school  Rabin Sapkota . It is abbreviated as CESBS or CEBS. It is one of the premier schools of the Chitwan district. CESBS was established in the year 2063 BS.

Secondary schools in Nepal
Chitwan District

Educational institutions established in 1983
1983 establishments in Nepal